Kļaviņš (feminine: Kļaviņa) is a Latvian masculine surname, derived from the Latvian word for "maple" (kļava). Individuals with the surname include:

Aldis Kļaviņš (1975–2000), Latvian slalom canoer
David Klavins (born 1954), Latvian-German piano maker
Edgars Kļaviņš (born 1993), Latvian ice hockey player
Jānis Kļaviņš (1933–2008), Latvian chess master
Olafs Kļaviņš (born 1964), Latvian bobsledder

Latvian-language masculine surnames